The 1984–85 season was the 83rd in the history of the Western Football League.

The league champions for the first time in their history were Saltash United. The champions of Division One were Portway Bristol.

Final tables

Premier Division
The Premier Division was increased from 20 to 22 clubs after Wellington were relegated to the First Division. Three clubs joined:

Bristol City Reserves, champions of the First Division.
Chard Town, runners-up in the First Division.
Paulton Rovers, third-placed club in the First Division.

First Division
The First Division consisted of 22 clubs, increased from 21 the previous season, after Bristol City Reserves, Chard Town and Paulton Rovers were promoted to the Premier Division. Four new clubs joined:

Ilfracombe Town, from the North Devon League – rejoining after leaving the league in 1959.
Torrington, from the South Western League.
Wellington, relegated from the Premier Division.
Westbury United, from the Wiltshire League.

References

Western Football League seasons
6